Nizhegorodka is a rural locality (a selo) in Zubovsky Selsoviet, Ufimsky District, Bashkortostan, Russia. The population was 2,541 as of 2010. There are 17 streets.

Geography 
Nizhegorodka is located 20 km southwest of Ufa (the district's administrative centre) by road. Zubovo is the nearest rural locality.

References 

Rural localities in Ufimsky District